George Salisbury may refer to:

 George Salisbury (governor), U.S. Navy officer and Naval Governor of Guam
 George Salisbury (director) (born 1972), film and music video director and graphic designer

See also
 George Salusbury (fl. 1545), Welsh politician